The Abana was a sailing barque wrecked at Blackpool in England on 22 December 1894.

History
Abana was built at Saint John, New Brunswick, Canada in 1874. She was originally homeported at Saint John, New Brunswick. By 1894, she was flying the Norwegian flag.

Loss
The Abana was sailing from Liverpool to Savannah, Georgia when she was caught in a storm in the Irish Sea. She was spotted at 3 pm drifting in a northwesterly direction with her sails torn to shreds. The crew mistook Blackpool Tower for a lighthouse and the ship  was first spotted foundering at North Pier, and ended up drifting north and was wrecked off Little Bispham at 5 pm. Flares were fired and the lifeboat was called out. The alarm was raised by the landlord of the Cleveleys Hotel. Due to the weather conditions, the Blackpool lifeboat Samuel Fletcher had to be taken some  overland to Bispham before it could be launched. The lifeboat had a crew of 16, and the Abana had a crew of 17, all of whom were taken on board along with the ship's dog, which belonged to Captain Danielson. The lifeboat grounded on a sandbank whilst returning to shore, but some of the crew members pushed the boat afloat and they managed to reach shore safely. All were taken to the Red Lion Inn to recover from their ordeal. The ship's bell and dog were given to the landlord of the Cleveleys Hotel, who had raised the alarm.

The remains of the Abana can still be seen at low tide at Little Bispham and the ship's bell hangs in St. Andrew's Church in Cleveleys. On 31 January 2008, the Riverdance beached within sight of the remains of the Abana.

References

1894 in the United Kingdom
Maritime incidents in 1894
History of Blackpool
Shipwrecks in the Irish Sea
Sailing ships of Canada
Victorian-era merchant ships of Canada
Ships built in New Brunswick
Merchant ships of Canada
Merchant ships of Norway
1874 ships
Tall ships of Norway